Shelton Public Schools is a school district in Shelton, Connecticut, United States. The district is located in the eastern Fairfield County. The superintendent of Shelton Public schools is Kenneth Saranich. Shelton Public Schools currently operates four K-4 elementary schools (see below), one upper elementary school (Perry Hill School - grades 5 and 6), an intermediate school (Shelton Intermediate School - grades 7 and 8), and one high school (Shelton High School). The Board of Education offices were moved to 382 Long Hill Avenue after the Ripton school closed and was renovated to accommodate the Board of Education offices.

Schools

Perry Hill School 
Perry Hill School reopened as an upper elementary school in 2010 after being a K-4 school. The building was renovated to accommodate a larger school population. Originally the school housed Shelton High School (built in 1969) and later Shelton Intermediate School (until 2001)

References

External links
 
 Shelton Public Schools at Great Schools
  Fairfield County School Rankings

School districts in Connecticut
Schools in Fairfield County, Connecticut
Shelton, Connecticut